Basirpur (Punjabi,) is a town in Depalpur Tehsil of Okara District in the Punjab province of Pakistan. It is located around 130 km (80 miles) south west of Lahore.

Basirpur is part of Depalpur Tehsil and is administratively subdivided into three Union councils.

References

Cities and towns in Okara District